The return on net assets (RONA) is a measure of financial performance of a company which takes the use of assets into account. Higher RONA means that the company is using its assets and working capital efficiently and effectively. RONA is used by investors to determine how well management is utilizing assets.

Basic formulae

where 

In a manufacturing sector, this is also calculated as:

See also
Financial ratio

References

Financial ratios
Investment indicators